Marcinkevičius is the masculine form of a Lithuanian surname. Its feminine forms are Marcinkevičienė (married woman or widow) and Marcinkevičiūtė (unmarried woman). Notable people with the surname include:

Justinas Marcinkevičius (1930-2011), Lithuanian poet and playwright 
Vilmantas Marcinkevičius (born 1969), Lithuanian painter

See also
Marcinkiewicz
Martinkevich
Martsinkevich

Lithuanian-language surnames